The Gibson, later Gibson-Carmichael, later Gibson-Craig-Carmichael Baronetcy, of Keirhill in the County of Edinburgh, is a title in the Baronetage of Nova Scotia. It was created on 31 December 1702 for Thomas Gibson, with remainder to his heirs male. The sixth Baronet assumed the additional surname of Carmichael. The eleventh Baronet was a Liberal politician. In 1912, he created Baron Carmichael, of Skirling in the County of Peebles, in the Peerage of the United Kingdom. The barony died in 1926, while he was succeeded in the baronetcy by his kinsman Sir Henry Thomas Gibson-Craig-Carmichael, 5th Baronet, of Riccarton (see below), who became the twelfth Baronet of Keirhill and assumed the additional surname of Carmichael.

The Gibson-Craig, later Gibson-Craig-Carmichael Baronetcy, of Riccarton in the County of Midlothian, was created in the Baronetage of the United Kingdom on 30 September 1831 for James Gibson-Craig, of 7 North St Andrew Square, Edinburgh. Born James Gibson, he assumed the additional surname of Craig in 1818. The second Baronet was a Liberal politician and represented Midlothian and Edinburgh in the House of Commons. The fifth Baronet succeeded his kinsman as twelfth Baronet, of Keirhill (see above) in 1926 and assumed the additional surname of Carmichael.

Gibson, later Gibson-Carmichael, later Gibson-Craig-Carmichael baronets, of Keirhill (1702)
Sir Thomas Gibson, 1st Baronet (died )
Sir Edward Gibson, 2nd Baronet (died 1727)
Sir Alexander Gibson, 3rd Baronet (died 1774)
Sir John Gibson, 4th Baronet (died 1781)
Sir Robert Gibson, 5th Baronet (died c. 1800)
Sir John Gibson-Carmichael, 6th Baronet (1773–1803)
Sir Thomas Gibson-Carmichael, 7th Baronet (1774–1849)
Sir Alexander Gibson-Carmichael, 8th Baronet (1812–1850) FRSE
Sir Thomas Gibson-Carmichael, 9th Baronet (1817–1855)
Sir William Henry Gibson-Carmichael, 10th Baronet (1827–1891)
Sir Thomas David Gibson-Carmichael, 11th Baronet (1859–1926) (created Baron Carmichael in 1912)

Barons Carmichael (1912)
Thomas David Gibson-Carmichael, 1st Baron Carmichael (1859–1926)

Gibson, later Gibson-Carmichael, later Gibson-Craig-Carmichael baronets, of Keirhill (1702; reverted)
Sir Henry Thomas Gibson-Craig-Carmichael, 12th Baronet, 5th Baronet (1885–1926)
Sir Eardley Charles William Gibson-Craig-Carmichael, 13th Baronet, 6th Baronet (1887–1939)
Sir (Archibald Henry) William Gibson-Craig-Carmichael, 14th Baronet, 7th Baronet (1917–1969)
Sir David Peter William Gibson-Craig-Carmichael, 15th Baronet, 8th Baronet (born 1946)

The heir apparent to the baronetcy is Peter William Gibson-Craig-Carmichael of Riccarton, the First born, first son of the 15th/8th Baronet, whose son is Christopher Robin Gibson-Craig-Carmichael. The second and youngest son of Sir David Peter is Timothy James Gibson-Craig-Carmichael

Gibson-Craig, later Gibson-Craig-Carmichael baronets, of Riccarton (1831)
Sir James Gibson-Craig, 1st Baronet (1765–1850)
Sir William Gibson-Craig, 2nd Baronet (1797–1878)
Sir James Henry Gibson-Craig, 3rd Baronet (1841–1908)
Sir Archibald Charles Gibson-Craig, 4th Baronet (1883–1914) killed in the First World War serving in the Highland Light Infantry
Sir Henry Thomas Gibson-Craig-Carmichael, 5th Baronet (1885–1926) (succeeded as 12th Baronet of Keirhill in 1926)
see above for further succession

See also
Gibson baronets

References

Attribution

Kidd, Charles, Williamson, David (editors). Debrett's Peerage and Baronetage (1990 edition). New York: St Martin's Press, 1990, 
The Peerage of the British Empire, & Baronetage, by Edmund Lodge, Norroy King of Arms, 27th edition, London, 1858, p. 643.

Kelly's Handbook to the Titled, landed, & Official Classes for 1903, 29th edition, London, 1903, p. 611.
Famous Scottish Houses – The Lowlands, by Thomas Hannan, MA, FSA(Scot), London, 1928, pps: 97 – 100.

Gibson-Craig-Carmichael
Gibson-Craig-Carmichael
1702 establishments in Nova Scotia
1831 establishments in the United Kingdom